"El Sinaloense" ("The Sinaloan") is a song written by [Daniel Pescador] in 1984. Today, people associate the Mexican Banda music genre with “El Sinaloense”, even though it can be performed in any Regional Mexican subgenre. It is a Son/Huapango.

Significance 
This song has become the most popular song in the Banda genre. "El Sinaloense" has been recorded by hundreds of recording artists, in both lyrical and instrumental versions.

The song has become so popular that many Sinaloans consider it their unofficial anthem.

See also 
El Sinaloense is the name of an album by Banda el Recodo featuring the song.

References

Mexican music